In materials science, bulk density, also called apparent density or volumetric density,  is a property of powders, granules, and other "divided" solids, especially used in reference to mineral components (soil, gravel), chemical substances, (pharmaceutical) ingredients, foodstuff, or any other masses of corpuscular or particulate matter (particles). 

Bulk density is defined as the mass of the many particles of the material divided by the total volume they occupy. The total volume includes particle volume, inter-particle void volume, and internal pore volume.

Bulk density is not an intrinsic property of a material; it can change depending on how the material is handled.  For example, a powder poured into a cylinder will have a particular bulk density; if the cylinder is disturbed, the powder particles will move and usually settle closer together, resulting in a higher bulk density. For this reason, the bulk density of powders is usually reported both as "freely settled" (or "poured" density) and "tapped" density (where the tapped density refers to the bulk density of the powder after a specified compaction process, usually involving vibration of the container.)

In contrast, particle density is an intrinsic property of the solid and does not include the volume for voids between particles.

Soil

The bulk density of soil depends greatly on the mineral make up of soil and the degree of compaction. In contrast, soils rich in soil organic carbon and some friable clays tend to have lower bulk densities due to a combination of the low-density of the organic materials themselves and increased porosity.

Bulk density of soil is usually determined from a core sample which is taken by driving a metal corer into the soil at the desired depth and horizon. This gives a soil sample of known total volume, . From this sample the wet bulk density and the dry bulk density can be determined.

For the wet bulk density (total bulk density) this sample is weighed, giving the mass . For the dry bulk density, the sample is oven dried and weighed, giving the mass of soil solids, . The dry and wet bulk densities are calculated as

Dry bulk density = mass of soil/ volume as a whole

Wet bulk density = mass of soil plus liquids/ volume as a whole

The dry bulk density of a soil is inversely related to the porosity of the same soil: the more pore space in a soil the lower the value for bulk density.  Bulk density of a region in the interior of the earth is also related to the seismic velocity of waves travelling through it: for P-waves, this has been quantified with Gardner's relation.  The higher the density, the faster the velocity.

See also
 Brazil nut effect
 Characterisation of pore space in soil
 Effective porosity
 Density meter
 Number density

Notes

External links
 University of Leicester podcast 'How to measure dry bulk density'
 Bulk density calculator
 'Determination of bulk density'

Density
Particulates
Soil physics